Yuri Abramovich Golfand (January 10, 1922 – February 17, 1994) was a Russian and Israeli physicist known, in particular, for his 1971 paper (joint with his student Evgeny Likhtman) where they proposed supersymmetry between bosonic and fermionic particles by extending the Poincaré algebra with anticommuting spinor generators. The algebra they constructed is also called a Super-Poincaré algebra. In the very same paper they presented the first four-dimensional supersymmetric gauge field theory – supersymmetric quantum electrodynamics with the mass term of the photon/photino fields, plus two chiral matter supermultiplets (for a more detailed version see the Tamm Memorial Volume cited below; English translation is presented in Shifman 2000.).

Yuri Golfand received Ph.D. in mathematics (1947) from Leningrad State University; from 1951 till 1973 and in 1980 – 1990 in Lebedev Physics Institute in Moscow.

Yuri Golfand was also a Refusenik. He was fired from his work at the Lebedev Physics Institute in 1973, two years after publishing his work on supersymmetry. After 18 years of waiting, he obtained permission to leave the Soviet Union and emigrated to Israel in 1990, where he worked at the Technion in Haifa and died in 1994.

For a comprehensive biography see B. Eskin's essay in the book "Physics in a Mad World" cited below.

References 

 M. Shifman. Introduction to the Yuri Golfand Memorial Volume «Many Faces of Superworld»
 Гольфанд Ю. А., Лихтман Е. П., Расширение алгебры генераторов группы Пуанкаре и нарушение Р-инвариант-ности, "Письма в ЖЭТФ", 1971, т. 13, в. 8, с. 452 (Russian). (Yu. A. Golfand and E. P. Likhtman, JETP Lett. 13, 323 (1971). Reprinted in Supersymmetry, Ed. S. Ferrara, (North-Holland/World Scientific, Amsterdam — Singapore, 1987), Vol. 1, page 7. )
 Yu. A. Golfand and E. P. Likhtman, «On the Extensions of the Algebra of the Generators of the Poincaré Group by the Bispinor Generators», in I. E. Tamm Memorial Volume Problems of Theoretical Physics, Eds. V. L. Ginzburg et al., (Nauka, Moscow 1972), page 37.

1922 births
1994 deaths
Israeli physicists
Russian physicists
20th-century Israeli Jews
Jewish physicists
Soviet emigrants to Israel
Soviet physicists